Eva Arias (born 8 October 1980, in Barcelona) is a Spanish athlete specialising in the middle-distance events and 3000 metres steeplechase. Her biggest success is reaching the final at the 2009 World Championships.

Competition record

Personal bests
Outdoor
1500 metres – 4:08.56 (San Sebastián 2004)
3000 metres – 9:11.39 (2009)
3000 metres steeplechase – 9:25.14 (Berlin 2009)
Indoor
1500 metres – 4:10.98 (Valencia 2009)
3000 metres – 9:11.39 (Turin 2009)

References

RFEA profile

1980 births
Living people
Spanish female middle-distance runners
Spanish female steeplechase runners
Athletes from Barcelona
Athletes (track and field) at the 2009 Mediterranean Games
Mediterranean Games competitors for Spain
21st-century Spanish women